Henri Dumat (born 20 February 1947) is a French former professional footballer. He played for Reims, Ajaccio, CD Castellón, Troyes, Libourne and Grenoble.

External links
 
 

1947 births
Living people
French footballers
Stade de Reims players
AC Ajaccio players
CD Castellón footballers
La Liga players
ES Troyes AC players
Grenoble Foot 38 players
Ligue 1 players
Ligue 2 players
Association football midfielders
Association football defenders